Dominica cuisine is the cuisine of the island nation of Dominica.    The cuisine is rooted in creole techniques with local produce flavored by spices found on the island.

Foods
Dominica's cuisine is similar to many other Caribbean islands including that of Trinidad and St Lucia. Though separated by water Dominica and other Commonwealth Caribbean islands have distinct twists to their meals. 

Breakfast is an important meal in Dominica and is eaten every day. A typical meal includes saltfish, which is dried and salted codfish, and bakes made by making a dough and frying in oil prove popular before a long days at work. Saltfish and bakes can also double as fast food snacks that can be eaten throughout the day; vendors and Dominica's streets sell these snacks to passers-by alongside fried chicken, fish and tasty smoothies. Other breakfast meals include cornmeal porridge which is made with fine cornmeal or polenta, milk and condensed milk and sugar to sweeten. More British influenced meals like eggs, bacon and toast are also popular alongside fried fish and plantains. 

Common vegetables eaten during lunchtime or dinner include plantains, tania, yams, potatoes, rice, and peas. Meat and poultry typically eaten include chicken (which is very popular), beef, fish which are normally stewed down with onions, carrots, garlic, ginger and herbs like thyme and using the browning method to create a rich dark sauce. Popular meals include rice and peas, Stew chicken, Stew beef, fried and stewed fish and many different types of hearty fish broths and Soups which are packed full with dumplings, carrots and ground provisions.

Roadside stands and small-town restaurants typically serve fried chicken, fish-and-chips and "tasty bakes" which are fried dough made with flour, water and sugar or sometimes salt, along with cold drinks. The island produces numerous exotic fruits, including bananas, coconuts, papayas, guavas, pineapples, and mangoes which can be eaten as dessert and be pureed or liquefied.

Dominica's national dish was the mountain chicken, which are snares of the legs of a frog called the Crapaud, which is endemic to Dominica and Montserrat.  Found at higher elevations, it is a protected species and can only be caught between autumn and February. However, as of 2013, the new national dish is callaloo, made from the green leaves of the dasheen plant and other vegetables and meat. The preferred callaloo dish is crab callaloo.

Beverages
Rivers flowing down from the mountains provide Dominica with an abundant supply of fresh water. Most local juices are made using limes, passion fruit, grapefruit, oranges, tamarinds or guavas.

Especially during Christmas time, a brew is made from boiling the calyces of the sorrel plant. A drink commonly served with breakfasts is cacao tea, made from boiling cocoa sticks with cinnamon and bay leaves. Other drinks include rum punch and smoothies. 

Dominica tea culture has a long history. Many traditional medicinal teas have origins with the original Carib culture of the island. Dominica brews its own beer under the Kubuli label.

See also

References

Bibliography

External links
Recipes 
Dining in Dominica

Dominica
Dominica
Cuisine